Syria competed at the 2022 Mediterranean Games in Oran, Algeria from 25 June to 6 July 2022.

Competitors
The following is the list of number of competitors participating at the Games per sport/discipline.

Medal table

|  style="text-align:left; width:78%; vertical-align:top;"|

|  style="text-align:left; width:22%; vertical-align:top;"|

Athletics 

Field events
Men

Boxing 

Syria nominated six boxers for the competition.
Men

Equestrian 

Syria competed in equestrian.

Jumping

Gymnastics 

Syria nominated 2 gymnasts in all-around and individual apparatus.

Artistic

Men

Judo 

Syria nominated 2 judokas for the competition.

Men

Weightlifting

Syria has nominated one weightlifter, an Olympic medalist Man Asaad.

Men

Wrestling

Syria nominated 6 wrestlers in the Greco-Roman and Freestyle.

Men's Freestyle  

Men's Greco-Roman

References

Nations at the 2022 Mediterranean Games
2022
2022 in Syrian sport